Gordon Inlet is an estuarine inlet, located in the Goldfields-Esperance region of Western Australia.

The estuary is transient and is quite shallow with a high rate of evaporation so that the estuary often dries out almost completely. The water is saline with salinity levels varying from slightly less than seawater to over four times as saline.

The inlet is wave dominated and functions primarily as a result of wave energy.
The main seagrass species found in the estuary is Ruppia maritima.

The inlet was named in 1848 by Surveyor-General of Western Australia John Septimus Roe after Gordon Gairdner, Senior Clerk of the Australian and Eastern Departments in the Colonial Office, later Chief Clerk of the Colonial Office and Secretary and Registrar of the Most Distinguished Order of Saint Michael and Saint George.  Roe also named the Gairdner River and Mount Gordon after Gairdner.

References

Estuaries of Western Australia
Great Southern (Western Australia)
Inlets of Western Australia